Lamprosema insulicola is a moth in the family Crambidae. It was described by Thomas Bainbrigge Fletcher in 1922. It is found on Praslin and Mahé in the Seychelles.

References

Moths described in 1922
Lamprosema
Moths of Africa